Dallas Mead (born ) is a New Zealand former professional wrestler, and professional rugby league footballer who played in the 1990s.

Playing career
In 1995 Mead was signed by the new Auckland Warriors franchise and played for the Warriors Colts in the Lion Red Cup. He was part of the side that lost the Grand Final that year.

He was signed by Warrington on a one-year deal in 1997 and played his first game for the club on the 21 January 1997. However, in just his second match, on the 28 January, Mead suffered a serious knee injury. He was later informed that the injury required surgery and in April he returned to New Zealand to undergo an operation.
Mead returned to the Warriors in 1998 and was selected for the New Zealand Māori tour of the Cook Islands.

Later years
Mead later became a professional wrestler, and he competed in the 2007 NZPWI Invitational.

References

Living people
New Zealand rugby league players
1975 births
Warrington Wolves players
Rugby league props
New Zealand male professional wrestlers
New Zealand Māori rugby league players
New Zealand Māori rugby league team players
New Zealand expatriate sportspeople in England